Exanthematic pustular psoriasis is a skin condition characterized by an acute eruption of small pustules, abruptly appearing and disappearing in a few days. It usually follows an infection or may be caused by medications.

See also 
 Psoriasis
 List of cutaneous conditions

References 

Psoriasis